Dial M is a UK music television series. The programme was devised by Paul Baxendale-Walker and was launched on 28 November 2012.  The shows are broadcast on Sky satellite television and online. The premise of the programme is the showcasing of a contemporary, and more established, music acts each week, recorded live in session in the studio, plus interviews, and links with live external music venues.

Guest Bands
The Strangers 
 The Tuesday Club
Chozen
The Damn Vandals
Picture Book
The Wholls
Heaven's Basement
Legend in Japan
Spear of Destiny
Fearless Vampire Killers
The Harlots
Nikki Murray
Rachel R
Sam Gray
Sam Wray
Stiff Little Fingers
The Jam

References 

2012 British television series debuts
Rock music television series
British music television shows
English-language television shows